= First hymn of Veria =

The First hymn of Veria or Veria mou (My Veria) is the first anthem of the Greek football club Veria F.C., based in Veria. The lyrics were written in 1960 by the Greek songwriter, composer and singer Giorgos Kalogirou, who was also the first to perform the anthem. The hymn's style is march-based.
